Zverinogolovsky District is an administrative and municipal district (raion), one of the twenty-four in Kurgan Oblast, Russia. It is located in the south of the oblast. Its administrative center is the rural locality (a selo) of Zverinogolovskoye. Population:  11,755 (2002 Census). The population of Zverinogolovskoye accounts for 42.7% of the district's total population.

History
The district was established in 1992.

References

Notes

Sources

Districts of Kurgan Oblast

